Katie Elizabeth Cook (born Downes; 16 May 1984) is an English glamour model and Page 3 girl.

Early life and career
She was born in Liverpool, England. She has appeared in nearly all of the British lad mags and has been on the cover of Loaded, Maxim, Nuts, and Zoo Weekly. Nuts ranked her 11th sexiest on their list 50 Hottest Blondes of 2008.

She had a cameo appearance in the movie Deuce Bigalow: European Gigolo as a window washer in a wet white T-shirt. In the movie's special features, she is seen auditioning for the role against Page 3 models Michelle Marsh, Nicola Tappenden, and Nikkala Stott.

She appeared in the reality television series Poor Little Rich Girls on ITV, where for a week she swapped her life as model with a young woman named Michelle McManus who worked as a toilet cleaner.

Personal life
She began dating the Arctic Monkeys guitarist Jamie Cook in 2006. They became engaged in 2012 and were married in May 2014.

See also

 Lad culture
 The Sun newspaper

References

External links
 

Page 3 girls
People from Liverpool
1984 births
Living people
Glamour models
Models from Merseyside